National Indigenous Training Academy is located in Yulara, Northern Territory, Australia. It was established in 2011, by the Indigenous Land Corporation to provide training programs for Indigenous Australians within the country's tourism and hospitality industry. The William Angliss Institute of TAFE provides the nationally-accredited training to students enrolled at the National Indigenous Training Academy.

References

Indigenous Australian education
Hospitality schools in Australia
Technical and further education
2011 establishments in Australia
Educational institutions established in 2011